Amy Kickbusch (née Korner) (born 23 April 1986) is a former Australian field hockey player.

References

External links

1986 births
Living people
Australian female field hockey players
21st-century Australian women
Sportspeople from Ipswich, Queensland
Sportswomen from Queensland
Field hockey people from Queensland